Ayaz Latif Palijo (Sindhi,) (born 15 November 1968, Thatta, Sindh, Pakistan) is a politician, lawyer, activist, writer and teacher. Palijo is the current president of Qomi Awami Tahreek (Peoples National Movement), central convener and founder of the Sindh Progressive Nationalist Alliance (SPNA), one of the founders and central Secretary General of Grand Democratic Alliance (GDA). Since 2007, he has represented the left, objecting to the division of the southeastern Pakistan province of Sindh.

Early life and education 
Palijo's mother Jeejee Zarina Baloch was a Baloch women's rights activist, founder of Sindhiani Tahreek, writer, artist and teacher. His father Rasool Bux Palijo, was a Sindhi leftist, scholar, writer and founder of Awami Tahreek.

At age eleven, Palijo was the central secretary-general of the Gulan Jahra Barira and the Sujag Bar Tahreek, the children's wing of the Qomi Awami Tahreek. He was then a university student activist.

Palijo received a LEAD (leadership for environment and development) training in the seventh cohort.

Political activism 
Palijo is the president of Qomi Awami Tahreek (QAT) of Pakistan (Peoples National Movement of Pakistan) he was central convener and founder of the Sindh Progressive Nationalist Alliance (SPANA) and is founder and central Secretary General of Grand Democratic Alliance (GDA). He said,

Kalabagh Dam 
His party manifesto is based on objectives of Social justice, peace, equality, and provincial autonomy in prospering Sindh and progressive Pakistan. Ayaz Latif Palijo and QAT are strongly against the corruption, feudalism, forced conversion, terrorism and construction of Kalabagh Dam.

Karachi Muhabat-e-Sindh (Love of Sindh) rally and Train March
In May 2012, Qomi Awami Tehrik (QAT) Party members and workers organised a Muhabat-e-Sindh (Love of Sindh) rally in Karachi against the formation of the foreign-sponsored Mohajir province. In the continuity of several Mohabbat-e-Sindh Rallies in all the districts of Sindh including Karachi, Ayaz Latif Palijo led a 03 days Mohabbat-e-Sindh Train March, which started from Karachi with the message of harmony and love for all the people of Pakistan, the march received a warm welcome at every railway station and ended with a mammoth sit-in in front of parliament house Islamabad.

Muhabat-e-Sindh rally attacked by terrorists 
In 2012, women were able to attend Muhabat-e-Sindh (Love of Sindh) rally in equal numbers to men. The marchers were attacked near Nawa Lane, Pan Mandi and Juna Market. Eleven people were killed and about thirty were injured. Palijo announced to the press a peaceful strike in Sindh to highlight the incident and said his party would stage a sit-in protest till the attackers were apprehended. Ayaz Latif Palijo declared that all the permanent residents of Sindh including Urdu-speaking Sindhis are our brothers and that they should unite for the betterment of Sindh and for unity, development and peace in Pakistan.

Lyari rally 
On Saturday, 14 July 2012, two months after the Muhabat-e-Sindh Rally, Palijo announced that a Shaheedan-e-Muhabbat-e-Sindh Jalsa would take place on Sunday, 15 July at Gabol Park, Lyari. In his speech, Palijo said, "Nobody can stop us from entering Lyari and other parts of Karachi." Palijo criticised the Sindh Government, saying that 4000 policemen were deployed by the Sindh government to stop his rally. After the announcement, the Sindh home minister ordered Palijo's arrest and Palijo received threats of attacks.

2013 Pakistan general election 
On 11 May 2013, a general election took place. Palijo was a candidate for PS-47 Qasimabad, Hyderabad constituency. Palijo lost the contest with 14,901 votes. Palijo challenged the result in the Sindh High Court and asked for a re-election. He claimed his agents at the polling booths had been harassed.

Disagreement with M. Q. M. 
On 4 January 2014, Altaf Hussain and the Muttahida Qaumi Movement (M.Q.M.) called for a separate province. Palijo disagreed and threatened strikes and protests. Two days later the M.Q.M sent a delegation under Wasim Akhtar and Kunwar Naveed to discuss the matter with Ayaz Latif Palijo and explained to him that they don't want the division of Sindh or a separate province, they just want powers for local government in Karachi. Palijo called off the strikes and protests.

References

External links
 Kalabagh Dam
 Southasian organisation archive

1968 births
Awami Tahreek politicians
Baloch people
Living people
Male feminists
Muslim reformers
Muslim socialists
Pakistani civil rights activists
Pakistani columnists
Pakistani democracy activists
Pakistani feminists
Pakistani human rights activists
Pakistani humanitarians
Pakistani lawyers
Pakistani legal scholars
Pakistani legal writers
Pakistani philanthropists
Pakistani progressives
Pakistani social scientists
Pakistani socialists
Pakistani women's rights activists
People from Thatta District
Proponents of Islamic feminism
Sindhi-language writers
Sindhi people
University of Sindh alumni
Writers from Sindh
Alumni of Wye College